The Tinjar Valles are an ancient set of outflow channels in the Amenthes quadrangle of Mars, located at 38° north latitude and 235.8° west longitude. They are 425 km long and were named after a modern river in Sarawak, Malaysia. They have been identified as outflow channels.

References 

Valleys and canyons on Mars
Amenthes quadrangle